The Abrafaxe – Under The Black Flag ( and also known as The Pirates of Tortuga: Under The Black Flag) is a German film directed by  and Tony Power. It was released in 2001 and is based on the popular and long running German comic strip series Die Abrafaxe by Lona Rietschel and Lothar Dräger.

Plot
The lead characters are three kids Abrax, Brabax and Califax (Alex and Max in English). They sneak into the back of the museum where they find a rare golden Aztec bowl. While playing with it a bit, its layers moved, and they were transported back in time. Both Abrax and Brabax landed in cargo space of Spanish galleon under captain Don Archimbaldo. Califax landed in pirate city of Tortuga governed by legendary beautiful and dangerous pirate Anne Bonny. Her father Shanty was killed by Blackbeard on story progression. At the end, Anne Bonny together with Abrax, Brabax, Califax and her crew uncover the secret island and treasure of El Dorado. Then Abrax, Brabax and Califax decide that it is time to go home, so they used that rare Aztec golden bowl to get back home to the museum where they put back the bowl. But they were caught by a security guard and the museum tour guide, then released. Just when they were outside of the museum, they saw a light similar to the one before when they were travelling, but now on top of the museum, as the story ended. (It is known that by accident the security guard of museum and the museum tour guide travelled in time, with a new adventure beginning where the old one left off.)

Cast and characters
Original German version
 Kim Hasper – Abrax (Alex in the English version)
 David Turba – Brabax (Max in the English version)
 Ilona Schulz – Califax
 Nena – Anne Bonny
 Helmut Krauss – Blackbeard
 Santiago Ziesmer – Don Archimbaldo
 Wilfried Herbst – Prado
 Ulrich Voß – Shanty
 Michael Pan – Carlos
 Stefan Friedrich – Juan

English-dubbed version
 Justin Bradley – Califax
 Holly Gauthier-Frankel – Anne Bonny
 A.J. Henderson – Blackbeard/Prado
 Rick Jones – Don Archimbaldo
 Susan Glover – Museum Curator

External links
 

2001 animated films
2001 films
German animated films
2000s German-language films
Animated comedy films
Pirate films
German children's films
Films based on German comics
Animated films based on comics
Films about time travel
Films set in the 1710s
Cultural depictions of Anne Bonny
Cultural depictions of Blackbeard
2000s German animated films
2000s German films